The River Ray is a tributary of the River Thames in England which flows through Wiltshire.

The river rises at Wroughton to the south of Swindon and runs in a generally northern direction, passing to the west of the town via Shaw. Near Roughmoor it is joined from the west by the Lydiard Brook. The river joins the Thames on the southern bank near Calcutt, east of Cricklade, just upstream of Water Eaton House Bridge.

The river has been subject to a restoration project run by the Wiltshire Wildlife Trust. The final stage, completed in December 2007, was to build a tunnel near the Great Western Way at Rivermead to allow the nine species of fish to travel the length of the river without obstruction.

See also
 Tributaries of the River Thames
 List of rivers in England

References

Rivers of Wiltshire
1Ray